West Calgary was a single member electoral district that was mandated to return members to the Legislative Assembly of the Northwest Territories, Canada, from 1894 until it was abolished in 1905.

History
West Calgary was created from the old Calgary electoral district. This took place after the passage of the North-West Representation Act 1894 passed through parliament. Calgary's electoral districts were split into this district East Calgary and High River.

Members of the Legislative Assembly (MLAs)

Election results

1894 election

1898 election

1901 election

The by-election was caused by the resignation of Richard Bennett, who resigned his seat to run for the House of Commons of Canada in the 1900 Canadian federal election.

1902 election

See also
Calgary West federal electoral district.
Calgary-West provincial electoral district

References

External links 
Website of the Legislative Assembly of Northwest Territories

Former electoral districts of Northwest Territories
Politics of Calgary